Elections to Chichester District Council in West Sussex, United Kingdom were held on 2 May 2019. The whole council was up for election and the Conservative Party had its majority wiped out.

Boundary changes 

In 2016, the Local Government Boundary Commission for England presented its proposed boundary changes for the Chichester District, following a three-month consultation with the public. This involved reducing the number of councillors from 48 to 36, and the number of wards from 29 to 21.

Summary

Election result

|-

Ward results

Notes and references 

2019 English local elections
May 2019 events in the United Kingdom
2019
2010s in West Sussex